"Rockin' Pneumonia and the Boogie Woogie Flu" is a song written and originally recorded by Huey 'Piano' Smith in 1957, who scored a minor Billboard hit with it, peaking at No.52 on the Top 100 chart, and a more successful No.5 on the Most Played R&B by Jockeys chart.

Background
The title is a reference to "walking" pneumonia and the Asian flu, hitting the United States in 1957-58.  According to the lyrics, the singer would like to approach a woman he sees in a club, or "joint," but due to his musical illness, he's unsuccessful.

Musician credits 
 Huey "Piano" Smith - piano
 Sidney Rayfield - vocals
 "Scarface" John Williams - vocals
 Lee Allen - tenor saxophone
 Alvin "Red" Tyler - baritone saxophone
 Earl King - guitar
 Frank Fields - bass
 Charles "Hungry" Williams - drums

Johnny Rivers recording

1972 saw the song become an international hit single for Johnny Rivers, featuring Larry Knechtel on piano as well as other Los Angeles session musicians from the Wrecking Crew.  
"Rockin' Pneumonia" reached No.6 on the U.S. Billboard Hot 100 during the winter of 1973.  It was Rivers' fifth highest charting song and spent a longer time on the chart (19 weeks) than any of his two dozen hits to that date.  On the U.S. Cash Box Top 100 the song peaked at No.5, and in Canada it reached No.3.

"Rockin' Pneumonia" gave Rivers his third gold record.  His final gold record would be with the 1977 hit, "Swayin' to the Music (Slow Dancing)."

Chart performance

Weekly charts

Year-end charts

Other cover versions
 In 1957, the tune was recorded by Larry Williams on Specialty Records. The back-up band included René Hall, guitar, Earl Palmer, drums, and Plas Johnson, tenor sax.
 The Crickets,on their 1960 album In Style with the Crickets.
 The Flamin' Groovies, in 1969, on their debut album Supersnazz, and again on their second album Flamingo, in 1970.
 Aerosmith, in 1987, for the Less than Zero soundtrack.
 Grateful Dead, on their Europe '72 tour at the Strand Lyceum, London, England, 23 and 24 May 1972.
 James Booker, on his albums Gonzo: Live 1976  and King of New Orleans Keyboard.
 Professor Longhair, in 1974, released only in 1997 on his album Rock 'n Roll Gumbo. 
 Deep Purple, on their 2021 album Turning to Crime.

References

External links
  (Huey "Piano" Smith)
  (Johnny Rivers)

Songs about rock music
Songs about jazz
Songs about blues
1957 songs
1957 singles
1972 singles
Huey "Piano" Smith songs
Johnny Rivers songs
Ace Records (United States) singles
United Artists Records singles
The Crickets songs